Charles Henry Margrett (10 August 1862 – 22 November 1941) was an English cricketer.  Margrett's batting style is unknown.  He was born at Cheltenham, Gloucestershire.

Margrett made a single first-class appearance for Gloucestershire against Sussex in 1886 at the County Ground, Hove.  Gloucestershire made 147 in their first-innings, with Margrett scoring 14 runs before he was dismissed by Jesse Hide.  In response, Sussex made 349 in their first-innings, which Gloucestershire responded to in their second-innings by making 219, during which Margrett was dismissed for a duck by Walter Humphreys.  Needing just 18 to win, Sussex reached their target without losing a wicket.  This was his only major appearance for Gloucestershire.

He died at the town of his birth on 22 November 1941.

References

External links
Charles Margrett at ESPNcricinfo
Charles Margrett at CricketArchive

1862 births
1941 deaths
Sportspeople from Cheltenham
English cricketers
Gloucestershire cricketers